This is a list of newspapers in Mexico.

Current newspapers 

{| class="wikitable sortable" border="1"
! scope="col" style="width: 200px;" | Newspaper
! Days ofpublication
! Headquarters
! Established
|-
| ABC
| Daily
| Monterrey, Nuevo León 
| 
|-
| ABC
| 
| Toluca, Mexico 
| 
|-
| La Afición
| 
| Mexico City
| 
|-
| El Autónomo
| 
| Guaymas, Sonora
| 
|-
| A.M.
| 
| León, Guanajuato
| 
|-
| Baja Times
| Bi-weekly
| Rosarito Beach, Baja California
| 1978
|-
| Biznews
| 
| Monterrey, Nuevo León
| 
|-
| Cambio de Michoacán
| 
| Michoacán 
| 
|-
| Campeche HOY
| 
| Campeche City, Campeche
| 
|-
| Contexto
| 
| Durango
| 
|-
| Coyuntura
| 
|  
| 
|-
| Crítica
| Daily
| Hermosillo, Sonora
| 
|-
| Criterio
| 
| Hidalgo
| 
|-
| Crónica
| 
| Mexicali; most of Baja California, Baja California
| 
|-
| La Crónica de Hoy
| 
| Mexico City 
| 1996
|-
| Cuarto Poder
| 
|  Chiapas 
| 
|-
| Cuestion
| 
| Mexico City
| 
|-
| El Debate
| 
| Culiacán, Sinaloa
| 
|-
| El Dia
| 
| Mexico City
| 
|-
| Diario de Acayucan
|
| Acayucan, Veracruz
| 
|-
| Diario Amanecer
|
| 
| 1980s 
|-
| El Diario
| Daily
| Juarez, Chihuahua
| 
|-
| El Diario de Coahuila
| 
|  Saltillo, Coahuila
| 
|-
| Diario de Colima
| Daily
| Colima City, Colima
| 
|-
| El Diario de Guadalajara
| Daily
|  Jalisco
| 
|-
| Diario de México
| Daily
| 
| 
|-
| El Diario de Monterrey
| Daily
| Monterrey, Nuevo León
| 
|-
| El Diario de Morelos
| Daily
| Morelos
| 
|-
| El Diario de Sonora
| Daily
|  Sonora
| 
|-
| Diario de Toluca
| Daily
| Toluca, Mexico
| 
|-
| Diario de Yucatán
| Daily
| Mérida, Yucatán 
| 
|-
| Diario del Yaqui
| Daily
| Ciudad Obregón, Sonora
| 1942 (circa)
|-
| Diario Eyipantla Milenio
| Daily
| San Andrés Tuxtla, Veracruz
| 
|-
| Diario Los Tuxtlas
| Daily
| San Andrés Tuxtla, Veracruz 
| 
|-
| Diario Oficial de la Federación
| Daily
|  
| 
|-
| Diario de Querétaro
| Daily
| Querétaro
| 
|-
| Diario Sonora de la Tarde
| Daily
| Ciudad Obregón, Sonora
| 
|-
| Diario Xalapa
| Daily
| Xalapa, Veracruz
| 
|-
| Diario Ventanas
| 
| Manzanillo, Colima
| 
|-
| El Dictamen
| Daily
| Veracruz, Veracruz
| 1898
|-
| El Eco de Nayarit
| 
| Nayarit
| 1917
|-
| El Economista
| 
|  
| 
|-
| Ecos de la Costa
| 
| Colima City, Colima
| 
|-
| Ecos de la Cuenca en Tepalcatepec
| Weekly
| Tepalcatepec, Michoacán
| 
|-
| Entorno Informativo
| 
| Hermosillo, Sonora
| 
|-
| Especialistas en Medios 
| 
|  
| 
|-
| Esto
| 
| Mexico City
| 
|-
| Etcétera 
| 
|  
| 
|-
| Excélsior
| 
| Mexico City
| 
|-
| Express
| 
| Tepic, Nayarit
| 
|-
| La Extra
| 
| Morelia
| 
|-
| El Financiero
| 
| 
| 
|-
| Frontera
| 
| Tijuana, Baja California
| 
|-
| Gente y Poder
| 
| Tepic, Nayarit
| 
|-
| Gringo Gazette
| 
| Baja California & Baja California Sur
| 
|-
| Grupo Diario de Morelia La Extra
| Daily
|  Michoacán
| 
|-
| Guadalajara Reporter
| 
|  Jalisco
| 
|-
| Hidrocálido
| 
|  Aguascalientes
| 
|-
| El Heraldo
| 
|  San Luis Potosí 
| 
|-
| El Heraldo de Chihuahua
| Daily
| Chihuahua, Chihuahua
| 1927
|-
| El Heraldo de México
| 
| Mexico City 
| 
|-
| El Heraldo de Saltillo
| 
| Saltillo, Coahuila
| 
|-
| El Heraldo de Tabasco
| 
| Tabasco
| 
|-
| El Heraldo de Toluca
| 
| Toluca, Mexico
| 
|-
| Imagen
| 
|  Zacatecas
| 
|-
| El Imparcial
| 
|  Oaxaca
| 
|-
| El Imparcial (Hermosillo)
| 
|  Hermosillo, Sonora and Arizona
| 1937
|-
| El Informador
| 
| Guadalajara, Jalisco
| 
|-
| La Jerga: Periodismo Gonzo Independiente 
| 
|  
| 
|-
| La Jornada
| 
| Mexico City
| 
|-
| Juárez Hoy
| 
| Ciudad Juárez
| 
|-
| El Mañana (Nuevo Laredo)
| 
|  Tamaulipas
| 
|-
| El Mañana (Reynosa) 
| 
| Reynosa
| 
|-
| El Mañana
| 
| Toluca, Mexico 
| 
|-
| El Mercurio de Tamaulipas
| 
| Victoria, Tamaulipas
| 
|-
| Meridiano de Nayarit
| 
|  Nayarit
| 
|-
| Mexican Online News 
| 
|  
| 
|-
| El Mexicano
| 
| Tijuana, Baja California 
| 
|-
| Mexico News Daily 
| Daily
| Puerto Escondito, Oaxaca
| 2014
|-
| Milenio
| Daily
| 
| 
|-
| Milenio (Monterrey)
| Daily
|  Nuevo León 
| 
|-
| Mural
| 
| Guadalajara, Jalisco
| 
|-
| My Press
| 
| Mexico City
| 
|-
| El Nacional
| 
|  Guanajuato
| 
|-
| El Nacional 
| 
| Mexico City
| 
|-
| The News
| 
| Mexico City
| 
|-
| Noroeste
| 
| Culiacán and Mazatlán, Sinaloa
| 
|-
| El Norte
| 
| Monterrey, Nuevo León
| 
|-
| Noti Arandas
| 
| Arandas, Jalisco
| 
|-
| Notiver 
| 
|  Veracruz
| 
|-
| Novedad Acapulco
| 
|  Guerrero
| 
|-
| Novedades de Quintana Roo
| 
| Cancún, Quintana Roo
| 
|-
| Novedades de Tabasco
| 
|  Tabasco
| 
|-
| Novedades de Yucatán
| 
|  Yucatán
| 
|-
| Nuevo Día
| 
| Nogales, Sonora
| 
|-
| Oaxaca Times
| 
|  Oaxaca
| 
|-
| El Observador
| 
| Tepic, Nayarit
| 
|-
| El Occidental
| 
|  Jalisco
| 
|-
| La Opinión
| 
|  Puebla
| 
|-
| La Opinión de Poza Rica
| 
| Poza Rica, Veracruz
| 
|-
| La Opinión de Torreón
| 
| Torreón, Coahuila
| 
|-
| Ovaciones
| 
| Mexico City
| 
|-
| Percepción
| 
| Hermosillo, Sonora
| 
|-
| El Periódico AM
| 
| Hidalgo, Guanajuato
| 
|-
| Periódico Central
| 
|  Puebla
| 
|-
| Periódico Correo
| 
|  Guanajuato
| 
|-
| Periódico Vanguardia
| 
| Saltillo, Coahuila
| 
|-
| Por Esto!
| 
| Mérida, Yucatán
| 
|-
| El Porvenir
| 
| Monterrey, Nuevo León
| 
|-
| La Prensa
| 
| Mexico City 
| 
|-
| La Prensa (Tamaulipas)
| 
| Tamaulipas
| 
|-
| La Prensa Sonora
| 
| Hermosillo, Sonora
| 
|-
| Primera Hora
| 
| Nuevo Laredo, Tamaulipas
| 
|-
| Primera Plana
| 
| Hermosillo, Sonora
| 
|-
| Público 
| 
| Guadalajara, Jalisco
| 
|-
| Pulso
| 
|  San Luis Potosí 
| 
|-
| Realidades
| 
| Tepic, Nayarit
| 
|-
| Récord
| 
| Mexico City 
| 
|-
| Reflexión Informativa Oaxaca
| 
| Oaxaca
| 
|-
| Reforma
| 
| Mexico City
| 
|-
| El Regional de Sonora
| 
| Ciudad Obregón, Sonora
| 
|-
| Ríodoce
| 
|  Sinaloa 
| 
|-
| Rumbo
| 
| Toluca
| 
|-
| Rumbo Nuevo
| 
| Tabasco
| 
|-
| Siglo 21
| 
|  
| 
|-
| El Siglo de Durango
| 
|  Durango 
| 
|-
| El Siglo de Torreón
| 
| Torreón, Coahuila
| 
|-
| Síntesis Hemerográfica Semanal 
| Weekly
|  
| 
|-
| El Sol
| 
| Monterrey, Nuevo León
| 
|-
| El Sol de Acapulco
| 
|  Guerrero 
| 
|-
| El Sol de Cuautla
| 
| Cuautla, Morelos
| 
|-
| El Sol de Cuernavaca
| 
| Cuernavaca, Morelos
| 
|-
| El Sol de Hermosillo
| 
| Hermosillo, Sonora
| 
|-
| El Sol de Irapuato
| 
|  Guanajuato 
| 
|-
| El Sol de Mazatlán
| 
|  Mazatlán
| 
|-
| El Sol de México
| 
| Mexico City
| 
|-
| El Sol de Morelia
| 
| Morelia, Michoacán
| 
|-
| El Sol de Nayarit
| 
| Tepic, Nayarit 
| 
|-
| El Sol de Puebla
| 
|  Puebla 
| 
|-
| El Sol de San Luis
| 
|  San Luis Potosí 
| 
|-
| El Sol de Sinaloa
| 
|  Culiacán, Sinaloa
| 
|-
| El Sol de Tampico
| 
|  Tamaulipas
| 
|-
| El Sol de Tijuana 
| 
| Tijuana, Baja California
| 
|-
| El Sol de Tlaxcala
| 
|  Tlaxcala
| 
|-
| El Sol de Toluca
| 
|  Toluca
| 
|-
| El Sol de Zacatecas
| 
|  Zacatecas
| 
|-
| El Sol de Zamora
| 
| Zamora, Michoacán 
| 
|-
| El Sol del Bajío
| 
| Celaya, Guanajuato
| 
|-
| El Sol del Centro
| 
|  Aguascalientes
| 
|-
| Sol del Sur 
| 
|  Tamaulipas
| 
|-
| El Sudcaliforniano
| 
|  La Paz, Baja California Sur
| 
|-
| El Sur
| 
| Acapulco, Guerrero
| 
|-
| El Sur de Campeche
| 
|  Campeche
| 
|-
| Tabasco Hoy
| 
| Villahermosa, Tabasco
| 
|-
| Tiempo
| Daily
|  Chihuahua 
| 
|-
| El Tiempo de Durango 
| 
| Durango, Durango
| 
|-
| Tribuna Campeche
| 
| Campeche City, Campeche
| 
|-
| Tribuna de los Cabos
| 
| San José del Cabo, Baja California Sur
| 
|-
| Tribuna del Yaqui
| 
|  Sonora
| 
|-
| Última Hora
| 
| Nuevo Laredo
| 
|-
| Unión Cancún
| 
| Cancún, Quintana Roo
| 
|-
| La Unión de Morelos
| 
| Cuernavaca, Morelos
| 
|-
| El Universal
| 
| 
| 
|-
| El Universal  Querétaro 
| 
|  Querétaro
| 
|-
| Unión Guanajuato
| 
| Guanajuato
| 
|-
| Unión Jalisco
| 
| Jalisco
| 
|-
| Unión Puebla
| 
| Puebla
| 
|-
| Unión Yucatán
| 
| Yucatán
| 
|-
| Unomásuno
| 
| Mexico City 
| 
|-
| Vanguardia
| 
|  Coahuila
| 
|-
| El Vigía (Ensenada)
| 
| Ensenada, Baja California
| 
|-
| El Vigía (Guaymas)
| 
| Guaymas, Sonora
| 
|-
| VivirAquí 
| Weekly
|  
| 
|-
| La Voz de la Frontera
| 
|  Baja California Norte
| 
|-
| La Voz de Michoacán
| 
| Morelia, Michoacán
| 
|-
| La Voz de Monclova
| 
| Monclova, Coahuila De Zaragoza
| 
|-
| La Voz de Piedras Negras
| 
| Piedras Negras, Coahuila
| 
|-
| El Zócalo
| 
| Piedras Negras, Monclova, Acuña, Coahuila
| 
|}

Defunct
 La Abeja de Chilpancingo
 The American Star
 La Chinaca
 Clamores
 El Colmillo Público
 Correo Americano del Sur
 El Demócrata Sinaloense, 1919-1999
 El Despertador Americano
 El Diario de Los Mochis
 Diario de México
 Diario del Hogar, 1881–1914, founded by Filomeno Mata
 Diario Monitor, 2004-2009
 Don Simplicio, 1845-1847
 Gaceta de México, 1722-1739
 El Hijo del Ahuizote, 1885-1903
 El Ilustrador Americano
 El Ilustrador Nacional
 El Imparcial, 1896–1914, established by Rafael Reyes Spíndola
 Madera
 México Nuevo
 El Monitor Republicano, 1846–1896, founded by Vicente García Torres
 Mujer Moderna
 El Mundo Ilustrado, 1894-1914
 El Museo Yucateco, 1841-1842
 Novedades de México, Mexico City
 La Orquesta, 1861-1877
 El Pensador Mexicano
 Regeneración
 Revista de Mérida
 Revista de Yucatán
 Semanario de las Señoritas Mexicanas
 Semanario Patriótico Americano, 1812-1813
 El Siglo Diez y Nueve, 1841-1858
 El Sol, 1821-1824
 :es:El Sol de Guadalajara, 1948-2015
 L'Echo français, 1902-1925
 Vésper
 Violetas del Anáhuac, 1887-1889

See also
 
 Proceso (magazine)
 Notable people:
 Elena Poniatowska
 Andrés Roemer
 Ángeles Mastretta
 Lydia Cacho
 Anabel Hernández
 Javier Valdez Cárdenas
 Francisco Ortiz Franco
 Miroslava Breach
 Regina Martínez Pérez
 Tamara De Anda
 List of journalists and media workers killed in Mexico
 Radio in Mexico
 Television in Mexico
 List of online newspaper archives: Mexico

ReferencesThis article incorporates information from the Spanish Wikipedia.''

Further reading
in English
 
 
 
 Marvin Alisky. Growth of newspapers in Mexico's provinces. Journalism Quarterly 37, 1960.
 
 

in Spanish

External links
 
 
 
 
 
 
 
 

Mexico
 
Newspapers